The 2010 Korea National League, also known as Daehan Life Korea National League 2010, was the eighth season of the Korea National League. It was divided in two stages, and the top two clubs of the overall table qualified for the championship playoffs in addition to the winners of each stage. It began on 26 March, and ended on 19 November. Foreign players were eligible for the participation since this season. Each club was able to have three foreign players on its roster and two foreign players in its line up.

Teams

Foreign players

Regular season

First stage

Second stage

Overall table

Result

Championship playoffs

Bracket

Semi-finals

Final

Suwon City won 2–1 on aggregate.

Awards

Main awards

Source:

Best XI

Source:

See also
2010 in South Korean football
2010 Korean FA Cup

References

External links

Korea National League seasons